is a passenger railway station located in the town of Kamikawa, Kanzaki District, Hyōgo Prefecture, Japan, operated by West Japan Railway Company (JR West).

Lines

Station layout
The station consists of oneisland platform on an embankment, which is accessed by an underground passage. There is no station building and the station is unattended.

Platforms

Adjacent stations

|-
!colspan=5|West Japan Railway Company

History
Hase Station opened on January 15, 1895, as a temporary terminus of the Bantan Railway from Himeji. The railway was stretched to the north in April 1895.  With the privatization of the Japan National Railways (JNR) on April 1, 1987, the station came under the aegis of the West Japan Railway Company.

Passenger statistics
In fiscal 2016, the station was used by an average of 19 passengers daily.

Surrounding area
 Kamikawa Town Hase Branch
 Okochi Power Station

See also
List of railway stations in Japan

References

External links

  

Railway stations in Hyōgo Prefecture
Bantan Line
Railway stations in Japan opened in 1895
Kamikawa, Hyōgo